First of May is a 2015 Taiwanese romantic-drama film. It was directed by Zhou Getai and written by Yuan Chiung-chiung. The film stars Richie Jen, Alyssa Chia, Lyan Cheng, and Cindy Yang. It was the latter's first and final film before her suicide. The film was released in Taiwan on 1 May 2015. The film’s title music was the Bee Gee’s song “First of May”. The Bee Gee’s album “Odessa” played a minor part in the dialogue of the film, as the group’s music had previously been banned in Taiwan.

Cast 

 Richie Jen
 Alyssa Chia
 Lyan Cheng
 Cindy Yang
 Kate Yeung - Kiki 
 Tou Chung-hua

Release 

The film was released in Taiwan on 1 May 2015 and in mainland China on 30 October 2015.

Reception 

The film earned  at the mainland Chinese box office.

References

External links

2015 films
2015 romantic drama films
Taiwanese romantic drama films
Central Motion Picture Corporation films